Valeri Yevgenyevich Sorokin (born 6 January 1985) is a Russian former football player.

Club career

Sorokin previously played for FC Dynamo Moscow, FC Spartak Nizhny Novgorod and FC Dynamo Bryansk.

References

1985 births
Sportspeople from Stavropol
Living people
Russian footballers
Association football midfielders
Russian Premier League players
Russian expatriate footballers
Expatriate footballers in Belgium
FC Dynamo Moscow players
R.W.D.M. Brussels F.C. players
K.A.A. Gent players
A.F.C. Tubize players
FC Tom Tomsk players
FC SKA-Khabarovsk players
FC Solyaris Moscow players
Russia youth international footballers
FC Lokomotiv Moscow players
FC Tambov players
FC Dynamo Bryansk players
FC Spartak Nizhny Novgorod players